Martin Babic (born 27 July 1982) is a Slovak football midfielder who currently plays for the Slovak Corgoň Liga club FC ViOn Zlaté Moravce.

References

External links
FC ViOn Zlaté Moravce profile 

1982 births
Living people
Sportspeople from Trnava
Slovak footballers
Association football midfielders
FC Nitra players
FC ViOn Zlaté Moravce players
FK Senica players
Slovak Super Liga players